The Pledge of Allegiance to the Philippine Flag, or simply the Pledge to the Philippine Flag, is the pledge to the flag of the Philippines. It is one of two national pledges, the other being the Patriotic Oath, which is the Philippine national pledge.

The Pledge of Allegiance to the Philippine Flag is recited at flag ceremonies immediately after the Patriotic Oath or, if the Patriotic Oath is not recited, after the national anthem.

The pledge was legalized under Executive Order No. 343, finalized by the National Commission for Culture and the Arts from a draft prepared by the Commission on the National Language, approved by President Fidel V. Ramos on Independence Day (June 12), 1996, and subsequently by the Flag and Heraldic Code of the Philippines, or Republic Act No. 8491. The law requires the pledge to be recited while standing with the right hand with palm open raised shoulder high. The law makes no statement of what language the pledge must be recited in, but the pledge is written (and therefore recited) in Filipino.

Text of the pledge

National motto 

Chapter III, Section 40 of Republic Act no. 8491, popularly known as the Flag and Heraldic Code of the Philippines, specifies the national motto of the Philippines, which echoes the last four lines of the pledge of allegiance.

The Philippine motto can also be read as the oath at the Text of the Pledge of Allegiance to the Philippine flag.

See also
Flag of the Philippines
Lupang Hinirang
Panatang Makabayan

References

Oaths of allegiance
National symbols of the Philippines